Pseudomonas savastanoi is a gram-negative plant pathogenic bacterium that infects a variety of plants. It was once considered a pathovar of Pseudomonas syringae, but following DNA-relatedness studies, it was instated as a new species.
It is named after Savastano, a worker who proved between 1887 and 1898 that olive knot are caused by bacteria.

The pathovar of greatest economical significance is Pseudomonas savastanoi pv. savastanoi, which causes the disease olive knot. Symptoms include formation of galls on infected trees; tumour formation is induced by indoleacetic acid biosynthesis by the bacteria, in a similar manner to the well-studied crown gall pathogen, Agrobacterium tumefaciens.

History
One of the first scientists to carry out scientific and modern research on the disease of olive trees caused by Pseudomonas savastanoi was Giuseppe Maria Giovene (1753-1837), who explained his conclusions in his publication Sulla rogna degli ulivi (1789).

Pathovars
 Pseudomonas savastanoi  causes ash canker.
 Pseudomonas savastanoi  attacks oleander.
 Pseudomonas savastanoi  causes olive knot.
 Pseudomonas savastanoi  attacks Phaseolus (bean) plants

Quorum sensing
P. s. pv. s. has an unusual quorum sensing dynamic: It shares quorum with an entirely different order, the Enterobacterales. Hosni et al., 2011 and Caballo-Ponce et al., 2018 find P. s. pv. s. produces very similar N-Acyl homoserine lactones (AHLs) to the Erwiniaceae Erwinia toletana and Pantoea agglomerans. Hosni find an avirulent mutant – defective for AHL production – is restored to virulence by the presence of E. toletana and P. agglomerans. These results demonstrate disease enhancing cooperation but also reveal a possible way that undiscovered cheating may be occurring.

References

External links
 Type strain of Pseudomonas savastanoi at BacDive -  the Bacterial Diversity Metadatabase

Pseudomonadales
Bacterial plant pathogens and diseases
Fruit tree diseases
Pulse crop diseases
Bacteria described in 1982